Diane Purkiss (born 30 June 1961) is Fellow and Tutor of English at Keble College, Oxford. She specialises in Renaissance and women's literature, witchcraft and the English Civil War.

Purkiss was born in Sydney, Australia, and was educated at Roseville College, Our Lady of the Rosary Convent, and Stuartholme School. She received a BA with first class Honours from  the University of Queensland and D.Phil. from Merton College, Oxford. She became lecturer in English at the University of East Anglia in 1991, and lecturer in English at the University of Reading in 1993.  In 1998 she became Professor of English at Exeter University, before taking up her current post at Keble College in 2000.

Publications
As author:
 The Witch in History: Early Modern and Late Twentieth Century Representations (Routledge, 1996)
 Troublesome Things: a history of fairies and fairy stories (Allen Lane, 2000)
 Literature, Gender, and Politics during the English Civil War (Cambridge University Press, 2005)
 The English Civil War: A People's History  (HarperCollins, 2006).

As editor:
 Women, Texts and Histories 1575-1760 (Routledge, 1992), with Clare Brant
 Renaissance Women: Elizabeth Cary's Tragedie of Mariam and Edward II and Aemilia Lanyer's Salve Deus Rex Judaorum (William Pickering, 1994)
 Three Tragedies by Renaissance Women, an edition of Iphigeneia at Aulis, by Lady Jane Lumley, The Tragedie of Antonie, by Lady Mary Sidney, The Tragedy of Mariam, by Elizabeth Cary, Viscountess Falkland (Penguin, 1998)

Purkiss also wrote children's books with her daughter, Alice Druitt, under the pseudonym Tobias Druitt.

External links
 Keble College webpage for Diane Purkiss

1961 births
Living people
University of Queensland alumni
Alumni of Merton College, Oxford
Academics of the University of East Anglia
Academics of the University of Exeter
Academics of the University of Reading
British literary historians
Fellows of Keble College, Oxford